Niemojewo may refer to:

Niemojewo, Brodnica County, Poland
Niemojewo, Włocławek County, Poland